Kudakwashe Mahachi (born 29 September 1993) is a Zimbabwean professional footballer, who plays as a midfielder for South African club SuperSport United F.C. and the Zimbabwe national team.

Career

Club
Mahachi spent the end of his youth career with Highlanders, before moving into senior football with Bantu Rovers. His spell with Bantu was short as he left soon after joining when he agreed to join Chicken Inn. He remained a Chicken Inn player for two years before departing in 2014 when Mahachi rejoined Highlanders. After another short stint, his next move saw him leave Zimbabwe for the first time as he joined Premier Soccer League side Mamelodi Sundowns in South Africa. 14 appearances and 1 goal followed in his debut season with the Sundowns, in his second campaign he was loaned out to fellow PSL club Golden Arrows. He scored four goals in twenty-five appearances in all competitions for Golden Arrows before returning to the Sundowns. He missed Golden Arrows' league match versus Jomo Cosmos on 11 May 2016 due to the passing of his daughter.

International
In January 2014, coach Ian Gorowa, invited Mahachi to be a part of the Zimbabwe squad for the 2014 African Nations Championship. He helped the team to a fourth-place finish after being defeated by Nigeria by a goal to nil. Mahachi scored his first goal for his nation in the aforementioned 2014 African Nations Championship and his second in a friendly versus Malawi.

Career statistics

Club

International

International goals
 Scores and results list Zimbabwe's goal tally first.

Honours

Club
Chicken Inn
 Zimbabwean Charity Shield (1): 2013

References

1993 births
Living people
Zimbabwean footballers
Zimbabwean expatriate footballers
Zimbabwe A' international footballers
Chicken Inn F.C. players
Highlanders F.C. players
Mamelodi Sundowns F.C. players
Lamontville Golden Arrows F.C. players
Orlando Pirates F.C. players
SuperSport United F.C. players
South African Premier Division players
2014 African Nations Championship players
2017 Africa Cup of Nations players
2019 Africa Cup of Nations players
2021 Africa Cup of Nations players
Association football midfielders
Zimbabwean expatriate sportspeople in South Africa
Expatriate soccer players in South Africa
Zimbabwe international footballers